Atmaram Govind Kher was an Indian politician, who served as a speaker of the 1st Uttar Pradesh Assembly, 2nd Uttar Pradesh Legislative Assembly and 5th Uttar Pradesh Assembly. He is three times speaker in the assembly.

Personal life 
He was born on 25 September 1894 in Gursarai, Jhansi and married Shantabai Kher on 9 June 1916. On 4 January 1982, he died.

References 

Speakers of the Uttar Pradesh Legislative Assembly
1894 births
1982 deaths
People from Jhansi